Finland was represented by Katri Helena, with the song "Tule luo", at the 1993 Eurovision Song Contest, which took place on 15 May in Millstreet, Ireland. "Tule luo" was chosen as the Finnish entry at the national final on 6 March and was Katri Helena's second Eurovision appearance, 14 years after her performance in Jerusalem in 1979.

Before Eurovision

National final 
The final was held at the studios of broadcaster YLE in Helsinki, hosted by Ari Korvola. Four performers took part, each singing two songs, with the winner chosen by voting from eleven regional juries.

At Eurovision 
On the night of the final Katri Helena performed 17th in the running order, following Slovenia and preceding Bosnia-Herzegovina. At the close of voting "Tule luo" had received 20 points (the highest an 8 from Greece), placing Finland 17th of the 25 entries. The Finnish jury awarded its 12 points to Norway.

Voting

References

External links
 Full national final on Yle Elävä Arkisto

1993
Countries in the Eurovision Song Contest 1993
Eurovision